The John VanMetre House is a log and brick Federal-style house built in Kearneysville, Berkeley County, West Virginia around 1780, and enlarged with a log ell about 1800.  Also on the property is a log smoke house, timber frame barn, and two sheds.

It was listed on the National Register of Historic Places in 2004.

References

Houses on the National Register of Historic Places in West Virginia
Federal architecture in West Virginia
Houses in Berkeley County, West Virginia
National Register of Historic Places in Berkeley County, West Virginia
Log buildings and structures on the National Register of Historic Places in West Virginia